The Hospital Center Line, designated Route D8, is a daily bus route operated by the Washington Metropolitan Area Transit Authority between Washington Union Station and MedStar Washington Hospital Center. The line operates every 20-30 minutes at all times. Route D8 trips are roughly 45 minutes.

Route Description
Route D8 operates daily between Washington Union Station and MedStar Washington Hospital Center connecting the hospital centers and Metrorail stations. The line also connects small neighborhoods to Metrorail stations. Route D8 currently operates out of Bladensburg division.

In the Hospital Complex,  Only northbound buses from Union Station stop at Washington Hospital Center and the Veterans Affairs Medical Center. Buses travel once through Washington Hospital Center. Passengers that are wishing to go southbound from Washington Hospital Center would get on a northbound bus, which will turn into a southbound bus to Union Station at the 1st Street terminal, and proceed directly on 1st Street to Michigan Avenue.

History
Route D8 originally operated between Friendship Heights and Distaff Hall (Army Distaff Foundation Inc) until the 1970s. 

Route D8 was created as a new route on June 4, 1977 to operate between Washington Hospital Center and Sibley Hospital alongside route D6, via the Hospital Complex, Trinity University, Glenwood Cemetery, the Edgewood Terrace Apartments, the Rhode Island Avenue Shopping Center, the Rhode Island Avenue–Brentwood station, Washington Union Station, Judiciary Square, Metro Center, and Dupont Circle stations.

When Dupont Circle station opened on January 15, 1977, both routes D6 and D8 did begin serving Dupont Circle in the middle of their routes. No changes were made in their route.

In March 1995, the line was split into two routes in order to simplify the line.

Route D6 was split to operate between Sibley Hospital & the Stadium–Armory station, via Washington Union Station, instead of operating to Washington Hospital Center in order to replace the segment of the former routes 40, 42, and 44 between Union Station and Stadium–Armory station when both 40 and 44 were discontinued and 42 was shortened to operate between Mount Pleasant and Metro Center station.

Route D8 was also split to only operate between Washington Hospital Center Washington Union Station. The segment of D8's routing west of Union Station was replaced by routes D1, D3, and D6. At the same time, the D8 replaced the segment of D6's former routing between Union Station and Washington Hospital Center, via Rhode Island Avenue–Brentwood station.

As a result, as route D6 became a part of the Sibley Hospital–Stadium Armory Line, which operated alongside routes D1 and D3 while route D8 became a part of the Hospital Center Line.

In 2014, WMATA proposed to shorten the D8 to Rhode Island Avenue station and to have a new Route D7 to operate between Rhode Island Avenue and the hospital campus in order to Improve reliability of service by operating shorter routes, Reduce the number of buses operating on the congested hospital roadways, and Create a better balance of capacity and demand throughout the line.

During the COVID-19 pandemic, the route was reduced to operate on its Saturday supplemental schedule during the weekdays beginning on March 16, 2020. On March 18, 2020, the line was further reduced to operate on its Sunday schedule. Weekend service was later suspended on March 21, 2020. Additional service and weekend service was restored on August 23, 2020.

In February 2021, WMATA propose to eliminate the D8 if they not get any federal funding.

References

D8